The Kaohsiung City Council is the city council of Kaohsiung City, Republic of China. It is currently composed of 65 councilors, each serving a four-year term, elected using the single non-transferable vote system. The speaker and deputy speaker of the council are elected by fellow councilors through a secret ballot. Kaohsiung residents, aged 23 or above and having resided in the city for more than four months, are eligible to cast their votes or run in the municipal election. Along with the New Taipei City Council, the city council is the largest Taiwanese local council in terms of seats.

History 

The present Kaohsiung City Council was established on 25 December 2010 following merger with the Kaohsiung County Council.

Provisional Kaohsiung City Council 
Succeeding the 40-member Kaohsiung City Senate on 11 January 1951, the Kaohsiung City Council, having 28 seats, was formed after Kaohsiung was designated a provincial city. Between the period of 1951 and 1979, the council seats had nearly doubled, while councillors had their term extended to 4 years. The city council, entering the transition period following Kaohsiung was promoted to a special municipality, was reorganized into the Provisional Kaohsiung City Council on 1 July 1979, with three new seats were added to the provisional city council. A successive Kaohsiung City Council, replacing the provisional city council, was founded on 25 December 1981 when the transition period ended.

Kaohsiung County Council 
After the retrocession of Taiwan and the ensuing devolution, 56 candidates were elected to the Kaohsiung County Senate upon the indirect election held on 15 March 1946. The Government announced in 1950 the reorganization of local governments, including partition of Kaohsiung County and Pingtung County, thus paving way for further devolution in Taiwan. The 48-member Kaohsiung County Council, succeeding the county senate, was established on 11 January 1951 after the local elections held on 17 December 1950.

Transportation 
The council building is accessible within walking distance of Fongshan West–City Council metro station.

Councilors 
District 1

 Hsin-Chiang Chu
 Fu-Bao Lin 
 Yi-Di Lin 

District 2

 Ming-Ze Chen 
 Ming-Tai Huang 
 Ya-Chu Li 

District 3

 Xin-Yuan Fang 
 Min-Lin Gao 
 Chiu-Ying Huang 
 Shu-Mei Li 
 Li-Pin Sung 

District 4

 Li-Chen Chen 
 Mei-Jyuan Chen 
 Mei-Jhen Li  
 Ya-Hui Li 
 Ya-Fen Li  
 Bo-Yi Li 
 Shan-Hui Chen
 Wen-Chih Huang

District 5

District 6

District 7

District 8

District 9
 Huang Jie

District 10

District 11

District 12

District 13

District 14

District 15

 Hui-Mei Tang

See also 
 Mayor of Kaohsiung
 List of county magistrates of Kaohsiung
 Kaohsiung City Government

References